The qualification for the 2013 FIBA Asia Championship was held in late 2012 from early 2013 with the Gulf region, West Asia, Southeast Asia, East Asia, Central Asia and South Asia each conducting tournaments.

Qualification format 
The following are eligible to participate:

 The organizing country.
 The champion team from the previous FIBA Asia Cup.
 The four best-placed teams from the previous FIBA Asia Cup will qualify the same number of teams from their respective sub-zones.
 The two best teams from the sub-zones of East Asia, Gulf, Southeast Asia and West Asia and the winner from the sub-zones of South Asia and Central Asia.

Berths

FIBA Asia Cup

Qualified teams

 Lebanon originally qualified for the tournament but was suspended by FIBA due to unresolved issues in its basketball federation. Iraq and the United Arab Emirates were asked to take Lebanon's slot in the tournament. However, they both begged off due to lack of preparation.

Central Asia
The qualification for Central Asia consisted of a single game. On May 7, 2013, in Astana, Kazakhstan beat Uzbekistan 80–60 and was qualified for the 2013 FIBA Asia Championship.

East Asia
The 3rd East Asian Basketball Association Championship for Men is the qualifying tournament for the 2013 FIBA Asia Championship. It also serves as a regional championship involving East Asian basketball teams. the five best teams qualifies for 2013 FIBA Asia Championship. The tournament was held from May 16 to 21, 2013 in Incheon, South Korea.

Preliminary round

Group A

Group B

Classification 5th–6th

Final round

Semifinals

3rd place

Final

Final standing

Gulf
The 13th Gulf Basketball Championship is the qualifying tournament for the 2013 FIBA Asia Championship. it also serves as a regional championship. the three best teams qualifies for FIBA Asia Championship 2013.

South Asia
The 2013 South Asian Basketball Association Qualifying Round for the 27th FIBA Asia Championship is the qualifying tournament for the 2013 FIBA Asia Championship. The winner qualifies for 2013 FIBA Asia Championship. The tournament will be held from June 2 to 4, 2013 in New Delhi, India.

Southeast Asia
The 10th Southeast Asia Basketball Association Championship is the qualifying tournament for the 2013 FIBA Asia Championship; it also serves as a regional championship involving Southeast Asian basketball teams. It will be held on June 20 to June 23, 2013 at Medan, Indonesia. The two best teams will qualify for the 2013 FIBA Asia Championship.

Preliminary round

Final

Final standing

West Asia
The 2013 West Asian Basketball Championship is the qualifying tournament for the 2013 FIBA Asia Championship. It also serves as a regional championship involving West Asian basketball teams. the two best teams excluding Iran qualifies for 2013 FIBA Asia Championship. The tournament was held from February 7 to February 9, 2013 in Tehran, Iran.

References

External links 
 FIBA Asia official website
 Gulf Cup results

qualification
2013 FIBA Asia Championship
SEABA Championship
East Asia Basketball Championship
2013
West Asian Basketball Championship